Bernard Sahlins (August 20, 1922 – June 16, 2013) was an American writer, director and comedian best known as a founder of The Second City improvisational comedy troupe with Paul Sills and Howard Alk in 1959. Sahlins also opened the Second City Theatre in Toronto in 1973.

Biography 

Born in Chicago, Sahlins graduated from University of Chicago in 1943. His brother is anthropologist Marshall Sahlins.

When Sahlins received an honorary doctorate from Columbia College Chicago in 2006, theatre department professor Sheldon Patinkin wrote:

In 1986, Sahlins co-founded both The University of Chicago's Off-Off Campus and The International Theatre Festival of Chicago. Sahlins is the recipient of The Sergel prize for playwriting, The University of Chicago Professional Achievement Award, The Chicago Drama League’s Professional Achievement Award, Joseph Jefferson Awards for directing and professional achievement, The Illinois Arts Alliance "Legend" award, and the Improv Festival Achievement Award.

On June 16, 2013, Sahlins died at his home of pancreatic cancer.  Survivors include his wife of 44 years, Jane Nicholl Sahlins, and a brother, Marshall Sahlins, both of Chicago. His first marriage to Fritzi Sager ended in divorce. A daughter from his first marriage, Lee Sherry, died in 2012.

Bibliography 
Bernard Sahlins, Ivan R. Dee (Editor) (2001). Days and Nights at Second City. 
Pierre Augustin Caron de Beaumarchais and Bernard Sahlins (1990) The Marriage of Figaro: In a New Translation and Adaptation. Ivan R. Dee Publisher. 
Bernard Sahlins, Molière (1999). The Bourgeois Gentleman (A Play). Samuel French ASIN B000MWX09E
Bernard Sahlins (2000). The Mysteries: Creation: A New Adaptation. Ivan R. Dee, Publisher; New Ed edition. 
Bernard Sahlins (1993). The Mysteries: The Passion. Ivan R. Dee, Publisher; New Ed edition.

References

External links 

 when he received his honorary doctorate.

1922 births
2013 deaths
American theatre directors
The Second City
University of Chicago alumni